Kamel Adjas (born 3 January 1963) is a retired Algerian international football player.

Titles

Clubs
ES Sétif
 Algerian Championship winner: 1987
 runner-up: 1983, 1986
 Algerian Cup winner: 1989
 African Cup of Champions Clubs winner: 1988
 Afro-Asian Club Championship winner: 1989

International
 Africa Cup of Nations winner: 1990
 Afro-Asian Cup of Nations winner: 1991

External links
Ali Benhalima file - footballdatabase.eu

1963 births
Living people
Algerian footballers
Algeria international footballers
1990 African Cup of Nations players
1992 African Cup of Nations players
Competitors at the 1987 Mediterranean Games
Mediterranean Games competitors for Algeria
ES Sétif players
Footballers from Sétif
Africa Cup of Nations-winning players
Association football defenders
21st-century Algerian people
20th-century Algerian people